Yinentulus is a genus of proturans in the family Acerentomidae.

Species
 Yinentulus paedocephalus Tuxen, 1986

References

Protura